A list of Portuguese films that were first released in 2015.

Highest-grossing films
The following is a list of the 10 highest-grossing domestic films in Portugal that were first released in 2015, as of December 16, 2015, according to the Instituto do Cinema e do Audiovisual.

List of films

See also
2015 in Portugal

References

2015
Lists of 2015 films by country or language
2015 in Portugal